William Odgers VC (14 February 1834 – 20 December 1873) was a Royal Navy sailor and a recipient of the Victoria Cross, the highest award for gallantry in the face of the enemy that can be awarded to British and Commonwealth forces.

Early life
Odgers was born in Falmouth, Cornwall, on 14 February 1834.

Victoria Cross
Odgers was 26 years old, and a leading seaman in the Royal Navy during the First Taranaki War in New Zealand when the following deed took place for which he was awarded the VC.

On 28 March 1860 at Omata, Leading Seaman Odgers of  displayed conspicuous gallantry when a party of officers, sailors and marines from the ship stormed Kaipopo Pa during operations against Maori insurgents. His citation read:

This was the first VC won in New Zealand. A few days later, HMS Niger bombarded civilian fishing villages at Warea, about 40 kilometres south of New Plymouth, where the defeated Maori force had regrouped, with cannon and rockets.

This action was labelled a "fictional triumph" and a myth by New Zealand revisionist historian James Belich. However Nigel Prickett embellished the action as a catastrophic defeat for southern insurgents who virtually no casualties Kaipopo Pa.

Later life
Odgers later achieved the rank of quartermaster, and was in the Coast Guard Service. He died in Saltash, Cornwall, on 20 December 1873.

His medal is displayed at Sheesh Mahal Museum, Patiala, India.

See also

 List of New Zealand Land Wars Victoria Cross recipients

References

External links
 Location of grave and VC medal (Cornwall)
 William Odgers and Family

1834 births
1873 deaths
People from Falmouth, Cornwall
Royal Navy sailors
Royal Navy personnel of the New Zealand Wars
New Zealand Wars recipients of the Victoria Cross
British recipients of the Victoria Cross
Royal Navy recipients of the Victoria Cross
19th-century Royal Navy personnel